The 2020 South Florida Bulls women's soccer team represents the University of South Florida during the 2020 NCAA Division I women's soccer season. The regular season began on February 7, 2021 (due to delay brought on by the COVID-19 pandemic) and concluded on April 11. It is the program's 26th season fielding a women's soccer team, and their 8th season in the American Athletic Conference. The 2020 season is Denise Schilte-Brown's 14th year as head coach for the program. The Bulls completed the regular season unbeaten for the first time in program history, with seven wins, zero losses, and two ties. They won the American Athletic Conference regular season title for the third time overall and second time in three years, then won the conference tournament for the second season in a row to clinch the AAC's autobid to the NCAA Tournament. They were eliminated in the second round of the tournament by Texas A&M.

Roster

Schedule 

|-
!colspan=6 style=""| Preseason
|-

|-
!colspan=6 style=""| Regular season
|-

|-
!colspan=6 style=""| American Athletic Conference Tournament
|-

|-
!colspan=6 style=""| NCAA Tournament
|-

|-

Awards and recognition

Players

All-American first team 

 Sydny Nasello

All-American second team 

 Sydney Martinez

AAC Offensive Player of the Year 

 Sydny Nasello

AAC Defensive Player of the Year 

 Chayanne Dennis

AAC Goalkeeper of the Year 

 Sydney Martinez

First team all-conference 

 Sydny Nasello
 Chyanne Dennis
 Vivianne Bessette
 Sydney Martinez
 Chiara Hahn

Second team all-conference 

 Sabrina Wagner

AAC all-rookie team 

 Vivianne Bessette (unanimous selection)
 Chiara Hahn (unanimous selection)

Coaches

AAC Coach of the Year 

 Denise Schilte-Brown

Rankings

References

South Florida
South Florida Bulls women's soccer
South Florida Bulls women's soccer